Baldwinville is an unincorporated community in Talbot County, in the U.S. state of Georgia.

History
A post office called Baldwinville was established in 1890, and remained in operation until 1907.
Baldwinville was located inland, away from railroads. The community had a schoolhouse, now defunct.

References

Unincorporated communities in Talbot County, Georgia
Unincorporated communities in Georgia (U.S. state)